The following article is a summary of the 2017–18 football season in Belgium, which is the 1145th season of competitive football in the country and runs from July 2017 until June 2018.

National teams

Belgium national football team 

Belgium qualified for the 2018 FIFA World Cup following a 1–2 win in and against Greece on 3 September 2017. Being seeded, Belgium was then paired with England, Panama and Tunisia in Group G.

2018 FIFA World Cup qualification

2018 FIFA World Cup

Group stage

Knockout stage

Friendlies

Belgium women's national football team 

Belgium made their debut at the UEFA Women's Euro tournament in 2017, being eliminated in a group with Denmark and Netherlands, who would both go on to play the final.
The team also played the first six of their eight qualification matches for the 2019 FIFA Women's World Cup, starting strongly with three wins.

UEFA Women's Euro 2017

2019 FIFA Women's World Cup qualification

2018 Cyprus Cup

Friendly

Men's football

League season

Promotion and relegation
The following teams had achieved promotion or suffered relegation going into the 2017–18 season.

Belgian First Division A

Regular season

Belgian First Division B

Belgian First Amateur Division

Belgian Second Amateur Division

Division A

Division B

Division C

Belgian Third Amateur Division

Division A

Division B

Division C

Division D

Cup competitions

Transfers

UEFA competitions
Champions Anderlecht qualified directly for the group stage of the Champions League, while runners-up Club Brugge started in the qualifying rounds. As cup winner, Zulte Waregem qualified directly for the group stage of the Europa League, while Gent and Oostende started in the qualifying rounds.

Overall, Belgian football clubs performed very poorly during the 2017–18 season, as both Club Brugge, Gent and Oostende failed to qualify for the group stages. Anderlecht only managed to win one match in the Champions League and although Zulte Waregem scored 7 points in their Europa League group they were also eliminated, causing all Belgian teams to be eliminated from European football before the winter break.

 Anderlecht was drawn in group B of the 2017–18 UEFA Champions League together with giants Paris Saint-Germain and Bayern Munich and looked to be battling it out with Celtic for the third place. Anderlecht lost the first 5 matches before winning 0–1 in Glasgow, but as they needed to overcome an earlier 0–3 home loss to become third, they were eliminated.
 Club Brugge first failed to qualify for the group stage of the 2017–18 UEFA Champions League after losing out to İstanbul Başakşehir before being eliminated by AEK Athens in the Play-off round.
 In the same manner as Anderlecht but in the Europa League rather than the Champions League, Zulte Waregem had also qualified directly for the group stage and failed to progress. Zulte Waregem also faced strong competition, being drawn against Lazio, Nice and Vitesse. Following 1–5 and 2–0 losses against Nice and Lazio respectively, they managed to obtain four points from their two duels with Vitesse. On the fifth matchday, an away loss to Nice meant elimination from the competition, but they finished the competition in style, with a 3–2 home win against Lazio.
 Gent, who reached the round of 16 of the 2016–17 UEFA Europa League, now immediately lost out to minnows Rheindorf Altach in the second qualifying round.
 Oostende entered European football for the first time in the history of the club. They were drawn against French giants Marseille and held them to a 0–0 draw at home. As they head earlier lost 4–2 in Marseille, they were also eliminated.

European qualification for 2018–19 summary

Managerial changes
This is a list of changes of managers within Belgian professional league football (Belgian First Division A and Belgian First Division B):

See also
 2017–18 Belgian First Division A
 2017–18 Belgian First Division B
 2017–18 Belgian First Amateur Division
 2017–18 Belgian Second Amateur Division
 2017–18 Belgian Third Amateur Division
 2017–18 Belgian Cup
 2017 Belgian Super Cup

Notes

References

 
2017 in association football
2018 in association football